A Resurrection may refer to:
 A Resurrection (short story)
 A Resurrection (film)

See also
 Resurrection (disambiguation)